Table tennis was contested at the 1974 Asian Games in Tehran, Iran from September 8 to September 15, 1974.

Table tennis had team, doubles and singles events for men and women, as well as a mixed doubles competition. China finished first in medal table with six gold medals.

Medalists

Medal table

References

 ITTF Database

External links
OCA official website

 
1974 Asian Games events
1974
Asian Games
1974 Asian Games